Louis-Marie Aubert du Petit-Thouars (5 November 1758, Bournois – 12 May 1831, Paris) was an eminent French botanist known for his work collecting and describing orchids from the three islands of Madagascar, Mauritius and Réunion.

Introduction
Petit-Thouars came from an aristocratic family of the region of Anjou, where he grew up in the castle of Boumois, near Saumur. In 1792, after an imprisonment of two years during the French Revolution, he was exiled  to Madagascar and the nearby islands such as La Réunion (then called Bourbon). He started collecting many plant specimens on Madagascar, Mauritius and La Réunion.

Ten years later he was able to return to France with a collection of about 2000 plants. Most of his collection went to the Muséum de Paris, while some species ended up at  Kew.
He was elected member of the prestigious Académie des Sciences on 10 April 1820.

Du Petit-Thouars is remembered as the author of the book Histoire des végétaux recueillis dans les îles de France, de Bourbon et de Madagascar (usually abbreviated in botanic literature as Hist. vég. îles France), illustrated by many beautiful drawings. Other books followed: Mélanges de botanique et de voyages and Histoire particulière des plantes orchidées recueillies dans les trois îles australes de France, de Bourbon et de Madagascar (l'île de France is the present island of Mauritius and l'île de Bourbon is the present La Réunion). He did pioneering botanical work by his descriptions of orchids from this region: 52 species from Mauritius and 55 from La Réunion.

Orchid genera named by Thouars

Angorchis Thouars 1809.(now : Angraecum Bory, 1804).
Bulbophyllum Thouars 1822, describing 17 species.
Centrosis Thouars, 1822. (now : Calanthe R.Br., 1821).)
Corymborkis Thouars 1809 (now : Corymborchis Thou. ex Blume 1855)
Cynorkis Thouars 1809
Dendrorkis Thouars, 1809 (now : Polystachya Hook., 1824)
Gastrorchis Thouars  1809
Graphorkis Thouars 1809 (now Phaius Lour)
Hederorkis Thouars 1809
Leptorkis Thouars ex Kuntze, 1891 (now : Liparis Rich.,1817).
Phyllorkis Thouars 1822  (now : Bulbophyllum Thouars, 1822).

Orchid species (of other genera) named by him
Cryptopus elatus Lindl. 1824, originally described as Angraecum elatum by Thouars (collected from the island Mauritius)
Mystacidium gracile [Thouars] Finet 1907

Plants named in his honor
Actinoschoenus thouarsii (Kunth) Benth. (family Cyperaceae)
Alafia thouarsii Roem. & Schult.(1819) (family Apocynaceae)
Arthrostylis thouarsii Kunth (family Cyperaceae)
Bambusa thouarsii Kunth (family Poaceae)
Cirrhopetalum thouarsii Lindl. (1830). (type orchid of the genus)
Corymborchis thouarsii Blume = Corymbis corymbosa 
Cycas thouarsii R.Br (1810), a Madagascan cycad (family: Cycadaceae)
Dilobeia thouarsii Roem. & Schult. (1818) (family Pteridaceae)
Drypetes thouarsii (family Euphorbiaceae)
Fimbristylis thouarsii (Kunth) Merr. (family Cyperaceae)
Jasminocereus thouarsii (F.A.C.Weber) Backeb. (family Cactaceae)
Lindernia thouarsii, (family Scrophulariaceae)
Moyinga thouarsii (common name : Elephant leg tree)
Protorhus thouarsii  Engl (1881) (family Anacardiaceae)
Strychnopsis thouarsii Baill. (family Menispermaceae)
Torenia thouarsii (Cham. & Schltdl.) Kuntze (family Scrophulariaceae)
Typhonodorum lindleyanum thouarsii (family Araceae)
Uapaca thouarsii (family Euphorbiaceae)
Voacanga thouarsii Roem. & Schult. (1819) (family Apocynaceae)
Vonitra thouarsii (family Arecaceae)

Other species named after him
Eucidaris thouarsii Valenciennes (common name : Slate Pencil Urchin) (Echinodermata)
Flabellum thouarsii (a group of scleractinian corals from Antarctica)

Family
 Brother:
 Aristide Aubert du Petit-Thouars (1760–1798) was a French Navy officer, a hero of the Battle of the Nile.
 Their nephew:
  (1769-1829), aide-de-camp to General Vignolle, later deputy prefect of Saint-Malo
 Their grandnephew and Abel Ferdinand Aubert's son:
 Abel Aubert du Petit-Thouars (1793–1864), was a French Navy admiral and botanist, took possession of Tahiti for France.
 Their great-grandnephew and Abel Ferdinand's grandson (by his daughter Sidonie):
 Abel-Nicolas Bergasse du Petit-Thouars (1832–1890), a French Navy admiral who participated to the Boshin War in Japan.
 note that Abel-Nicolas Bergasse was Abel Aubert's nephew, but also became his adopted son

References

18th-century French botanists
Orchidologists
1758 births
1831 deaths
Botanists active in Africa
People from Maine-et-Loire
Botanists with author abbreviations
19th-century French botanists
Dupetit Thouars family